Dharmendra Pratap Singh (born 1983) is an Indian who is among the tallest living people at . He currently lives in Uttar Pradesh, India. He is currently listed as the tallest man in India by The Limca Book of Records.

See also 
 Robert Wadlow, tallest man ever
 Sultan Kosen, tallest living human
 Vikas Uppal, tallest Indian ever
 Siddiqa Parveen, tallest Indian woman

References 

1983 births
Living people
People with acromegaly
People with gigantism
21st-century Indian people
Indian circus performers